The 2009–10 WHL season is the 44th season of the Western Hockey League (WHL). The regular season began on September 17, 2009 and ended on March 14, 2010. The 2009 Subway Super Series (formerly ADT Canada-Russia Challenge), featuring Team WHL versus Team Russia, took place from November 25–26, 2009.

League notes 
Offseason
 May 27, 2009 — The WHL announced that they have extended their partnership with Shaw TV for an additional five years commencing through the 2013–14 season.
 May 28, 2009 — 13 WHL players were invited to Canada's National Men's Summer Under-18 Selections Camp.
 May 29, 2009 — 11 WHL players were invited to the Hockey Canada's National Junior Team Development Camp.
 June 17, 2009 — The WHL Board of Governors agreed to adopt video-replay during the regular season and playoffs commencing with the 2009–10 season. The WHL introduced video-replay during the 2009 playoffs.  With the decision, The WHL will expand its officiating development program to include video training centres for referees and additional linesmen training camps throughout Western Canada.
 June 17, 2009 — The WHL Board of Governors adopted a new player recruitment strategy which will include the hiring of a Director of Player Recruitment that will focus on promoting the WHL Scholarship program and other overall benefits of playing in the WHL to top prospects in Western Canada and the United States.
 June 17, 2009 — The WHL Board of Governors also announced the introduction of a series of new online post-secondary education initiatives that will improve players' access to University courses while they are playing in the WHL starting in the 2009–10 season.  The new initiative was done through the support of the WHL Alumni Association and the league's corporate sponsorship.
 June 21, 2009 — Prince Albert Raiders broadcaster Morley Jaeger died at the age of 72.
 July 3, 2009 —18 WHL Grads Invited to Hockey Canada's National Men's Team Orientation Camp in Calgary.
 July 20, 2009 — The entire 1989 Memorial Cup Championship Team of the Swift Current Broncos were inducted into the Swift Current Broncos Hall of Fame. The first time that an entire team was inducted into the local Hall of Fame.
 July 29, 2009 — The Province of Alberta announced $17.8 million to support the completion of Lethbridge's Enmax Centre Expansion project.
 August 14, 2009 — Canada's National Men's Summer Under-18 Team claimed first place at the 2009 Memorial of Ivan Hlinka tournament, with a 9–2 win over Russia.
 August 17, 2009 — Two months after the passing of their broadcaster, longtime supporter and former Raiders team president, John Odnokon died at the age of 78.

Pre-season
 August 31, 2009 — The Canadian Hockey League announced an expanded corporate sponsorship deal with Subway, which includes a new title sponsorship agreement that replaces ADT.  Through this new agreement the ADT Canada-Russia Challenge is renamed the Subway Super Series for the next three years.
 September 9, 2009 — All 22 teams in the WHL unveiled their new Reebok Edge jerseys, which have been used in the National Hockey League since the 2007-08 NHL season.

Regular season
 September 17, 2009 — Due to enhancement of in-house video production from all 22 teams, the WHL and its broadcast partner INSINC will be able to show all 792 WHL Regular-Season games on the internet during the 2009-10 season. All games will be shown on WHL Web TV.
 September 25, 2009 —The WHL and Hockey Alberta will enhance their longstanding partnership that will include joint programming initiatives and additional financial support for minor hockey and high performance programs in Alberta. Through this newly enhanced partnership, new province-wide programming initiatives will help enhance development opportunities for players, coaches, officials and trainers in the Alberta system. The partnership will also feature both the WHL and Hockey Alberta extensively promoting their respective programs through special events, member venues, and media platforms.
 October 13, 2009 — The WHL launched WHL Mobile, which is a mobile-optimized version of its website designed specifically for users of Apple iPhone and iPod Touch, BlackBerry, HTC Touch, and other web-enabled smartphones. WHL Mobile will feature news and information from WHL.ca and will also provide full game summaries, full rosters, player profiles, news articles, etc. through smartphone devices.
 December 3, 2009 — Ten players from the WHL have been invited to Team Canada's Selection Camp roster for the upcoming 2010 World Junior Ice Hockey Championships.
 December 23, 2009 — The WHL announced a multi-year deal with FSN Northwest to broadcast WHL games starting with ten games in the 2009-10 season til the 2011-12 season.
 January 10, 2010 — WHL Trade Deadline ended with 15 trades.
 January 15, 2010 — The WHL and BC Hockey announced a new long-term partnership which will provide additional financial support for the hockey system in the province of British Columbia and the Yukon territory.
 January 20, 2010 — The 2010 CHL Top Prospects Game was held in Windsor, Ontario.
 February 6, 2010 — Brendan Burke, who is the 21-year-old son of Toronto Maple Leafs general manager and Chilliwack Bruins owner, Brian Burke died in an automobile accident in the United States during the 2010 snow storms.  For the remainder of the season the Chilliwack Bruins wore a special patch on their jerseys.

Regular season 
The Western Hockey League opened its 44th regular season on September 17, 2009 in Kelowna, British Columbia between defending WHL Champions, Kelowna Rockets and the Vancouver Giants.

The 2009–10 WHL season was also highlighted with the Subway Super Series (formerly Canada-Russia Challenge), an annual CHL showcase event. The 2009 Subway Super Series, featured a two-game series between Team WHL versus Team Russia, on November 25, 2009 in Victoria, British Columbia, and the second game took place on November 26, 2009 in Kelowna, British Columbia.

Standings 
Note: GP = Games played, W = Wins, L = Losses, T = Ties, OTL = Overtime losses, Pts = Points, GF = Goals for, GA = Goals against, PIM = Penalties in minutes

Conference standings

x - team clinched Western Hockey League Playoff spot

y - team is division leader

z - team has clinched division

Division standings
 Eastern Conference

 Western Conference

x - team clinched Western Hockey League Playoff spot

y - team is division leader

z - team has clinched division

Scoring leaders 
Note: GP = Games played; G = Goals; A = Assists; Pts. = Points; PIM = Penalty minutes

Goaltending leaders 
Note: GP = Games played; Mins = Minutes played; W = Wins; L = Losses; OTL = Overtime losses; SOL = Shootout Losses; SO = Shutouts; GAA = Goals against average; Sv% = Save percentage 

1 Previously played with Prince Albert Raiders

Players

2009 NHL Entry Draft 
In total, 31 WHL players were selected at the 2009 NHL Entry Draft.

Contracts and scholarships 
 May 15, 2009 — Steven Hodges and Kade Pilton sign WHL Player Contracts with the Chilliwack Bruins.
 May 18, 2009 — Derrick Pouliot signs a WHL Players Contract with the Portland Winterhawks.
 May 18, 2009 — Morgan Rielly signs a WHL Players Contract with the Moose Jaw Warriors.
 May 22, 2009 — Mike Winther signs a WHL Players Contract with the Prince Albert Raiders.
 May 24, 2009 — Ryan Olsen signs a WHL Players Contract with the Saskatoon Blades.
 May 27, 2009 — Griffin Reinhart signs a WHL Players Contract with the Edmonton Oil Kings.
 May 30, 2009 — WHL Grads Jesse Deckert and Brandon Lockerby commits to the Manitoba Bisons.
 June 3, 2009 — WHL Grad Justin McCrae commits to the UBC Thunderbirds.
 June 3, 2009 — Josh Smith signs a WHL Players Contract with the Prince George Cougars.
 June 6, 2009 — Connor Rankin signs a WHL Players Contract with the Tri-City Americans.
 June 8, 2009 — Troy Bourke signs a WHL Players Contract with the Prince George Cougars.
 June 8, 2009 — WHL Grad Carter Smith commits to the Regina Cougars.
 June 10, 2009 — Dave Hunchak signs a WHL Players Contract with the Moose Jaw Warriors.
 June 16, 2009 — WHL Grad Ian Duval commits to the Manitoba Bisons.
 June 19, 2009 — Nicholas Walters signs a WHL Educational Contract with the Everett Silvertips.
 June 25, 2009 — WHL Grads Eric Frere, Graham Potuer, Luke Egener commits to the Calgary Dinos.
 June 29, 2009 — WHL Grad Chad Erb commits to the Manitoba Bisons.
 July 8, 2009 — WHL Grad Tyler Swystun commits to the Calgary Dinos.
 July 11, 2009 — Taylor Aronson, Spencer Bennett, and Seth Swenson sign WHL Players Contracts with the Portland Winterhawks.
 July 16, 2009 — WHL Grad Partik Bhungal commits to the Regina Cougars.
 July 21, 2009 — WHL Grad Scott Wasden commits to the UBC Thunderbirds.
 July 21, 2009 — WHL Grads Joey Perricone, Spencer McAvoy, and Brennen Wray commits to the StFX X-Men.
 July 29, 2009 — Kevin Connauton signs a WHL Players Contract with the Vancouver Giants.
 August 4, 2009 — Taylor Leier and Nino Niederreiter sign WHL Player Contracts with the Portland Winterhawks.
 August 7, 2009 — Andrew Bailey, Brennan Bosch, Kyle Bortis, Kyle Ross, Cody Hobbs, Brett Ward, and David Reekie commits to the Saskatchewan Huskies.
 August 9, 2009 — WHL Grads Colin Joe, Ian Barteaux, Travis Yonkman, Sean Ringrose and Michael MacAngus commits to the Alberta Golden Bears.
 August 9, 2009 — WHL Grads Taylor Procyshen, Jeff Lee and Ben Wright commits to the UNB Varsity Reds.
 August 12, 2009 — Josh Hanson signs a WHL Players Contract with the Portland Winterhawks.
 August 18, 2009 — WHL Grad Mike Reich commits to the STU Tommies.
 August 19, 2009 — Ryan Johansen signs a WHL Players Contract with the Portland Winterhawks.
 August 24, 2009 — Dalton Sward and Matthieu Bellerive sign WHL Players Contracts with the Vancouver Giants.
 August 25, 2009 — Brett Cote, Turner Popoff, Brandon Magee, Zane Jones, Matt Bissett, and Travis Belhorad sign Standard WHL Education Contracts with the Chilliwack Bruins.
 August 25, 2009 — Chandler Stephenson and Tayler Balog sign WHL Players Contracts with the Regina Pats.
 August 27, 2009 — WHL Grad Cale Jefferies commits to the Guelph Gryphons.
 August 27, 2009 — Andrew Sullivan, Andy Blanke, Adam Lowry and Shea Howorko sign WHL Players Contracts with the Swift Current Broncos.
 August 28, 2009 — Mitchell Moroz signs WHL Players Contract with the Edmonton Oil Kings.
 August 31, 2009 — Dane Muench and Graeme Craig sign WHL Players Contracts with the Swift Current Broncos.

Trades

Subway Super Series 
The Subway Super Series (formerly known as ADT Canada Russia Challenge) is a six-game series featuring four teams: three from the Canadian Hockey League (CHL) versus Russia's National Junior hockey team. Within the Canadian Hockey League umbrella, one team from each of its three leagues — the Ontario Hockey League, Quebec Major Junior Hockey League, and Western Hockey League — compete in two games against the Russian junior team.

The 2009 Subway Super Series was held in six cities across Canada, with two cities for each league within the Canadian Hockey League. The series begun on November 16, 2009, and concluded on November 26, 2009. Both Western Hockey League games were held in the province of British Columbia. Former Victoria Cougar goaltender and Hall of Famer, Grant Fuhr was named Honorary Captain for the first game in the series, held in Victoria on November 25, 2009. The next night, retired Kelowna fire chief, Gerry Zimmermann, was named Honorary Captain for the final game of the series, who was a popular local citizen who led Kelowna through the devastating Okanagan Mountain Park Fire that burned 200 homes in 2003.

All six games were televised nationwide on Rogers Sportsnet, which broadcast both games from the Western Hockey League.

Results 
In the first game of the two part series between Team WHL and Team Russia, Team WHL scored two goals en route to a 2–1 win in front of 6,695 fans at Save-On-Foods Memorial Centre in Victoria, British Columbia. Goaltender, Igor Bobkov of Team Russia and forward Levko Koper of Team WHL, were named Players of the Game for their respective teams. The next night at Prospera Place in Kelowna, British Columbia, Team WHL defeated Team Russia 4–2 to end the series and give the CHL a clean 6–0 sweep.  Goaltender Igor Bobkov was named Team Russia's Player of the Game for the second straight night, while Brandon McMillan was named Team WHL's Player of the Game.

2010 WHL Playoffs

Overview

Conference Quarter-finals

Eastern Conference

(1) Calgary Hitmen vs. (8) Moose Jaw Warriors

(2) Brandon Wheat Kings vs. (7) Swift Current Broncos

(3) Saskatoon Blades vs. (6) Red Deer Rebels

(4) Kootenay Ice vs. (5) Medicine Hat Tigers

Western Conference

(1) Tri-City Americans vs. (8) Chilliwack Bruins

(2) Vancouver Giants vs. (7) Kamloops Blazers

(3) Everett Silvertips vs. (6) Kelowna Rockets

(4) Spokane Chiefs vs. (5) Portland Winterhawks

Conference Semi-finals

Eastern Conference

(1) Calgary Hitmen vs. (5) Medicine Hat Tigers

(2) Brandon Wheat Kings vs. (3) Saskatoon Blades

Western Conference

(1) Tri-City Americans vs. (6) Kelowna Rockets

(2) Vancouver Giants vs. (5) Portland Winterhawks

Conference Finals

Eastern Conference

(1) Calgary Hitmen vs. (2) Brandon Wheat Kings

Western Conference

(1) Tri-City Americans vs. (2) Vancouver Giants

WHL Championship

(E1) Calgary Hitmen vs. (W1) Tri-City Americans

Memorial Cup 

The 92nd MasterCard Memorial Cup was held in Brandon, Manitoba.

WHL awards

All-Star Teams

Eastern Conference

Western Conference 

denotes unanimous selection

See also 
 2010 Memorial Cup
 List of WHL seasons
 2009–10 OHL season
 2009–10 QMJHL season
 2009 NHL Entry Draft
 2009 in ice hockey
 2010 in ice hockey

References

External links 

 Official website of the Western Hockey League
 Official website of the Canadian Hockey League
 Official website of the MasterCard Memorial Cup
 Official website of the Home Hardware Top Prospects Game
 Official website of the Subway Super Series

Western Hockey League seasons
Whl
4